Carlos Jermaine King (born November 25, 1973) is a former professional American football running back in the National Football League (NFL). He attended North Carolina State. King played in one game for the Pittsburgh Steelers in 1998.

Personal life
King lives in North Carolina with his wife and two children. He runs a successful business that performs power washing and dryer vent and air duct cleaning.

External links
Pro-Football reference

1973 births
Living people
Players of American football from California
Pittsburgh Steelers players
NC State Wolfpack football players
Sportspeople from Orange County, California
People from Garden Grove, California